Alternative (Alternativa, A) is a political party in North Macedonia representing the Albanian minority.

History
The party was formed on March 10, 2019. Afrim Gashi was elected president of the party.

In the 2020 parliamentary election, the party ran in a coalition with the Alliance for Albanians.

References 

Albanian political parties in North Macedonia
Political parties established in 2019